Syed J. R. Mudassir Husain (born 1 March 1940) is a Bangladeshi jurist who served as the 14th Chief Justice of Bangladesh during 2004–2007.

Background and education
Husains' uncle, Syed A. B. Mahmud Hossain, was the second Chief Justice of Bangladesh. Husain completed his BA and LLB from the University of Dhaka.

Career
Husain was enrolled as a High Court advocate in 1965. He was then appointed as a High Court judge on 18 February 1992 and elevated to the Appellate Division on 5 March 2002.

Husain was appointed assistant attorney general in 1977 and deputy attorney general on 8 January 1984.

Husain worked as part-time lecturer at Central Law College, Dhaka during 1966–78.

Personal life
Husain is married to Syeda Majida Khatun. Together they had three daughters and a son.

References

1940 births
Living people
People from Habiganj District
University of Dhaka alumni
Supreme Court of Bangladesh justices
Chief justices of Bangladesh